Eucalyptus todtiana, commonly known as coastal blackbutt pricklybark or , is a species of tree or a mallee that is endemic to the west coast of Western Australia. It has rough, fibrous and flaky bark on the trunk, smooth bark on the branches, lance-shaped adult leaves, flower buds in groups of between seven and eleven, white flowers and cup-shaped to hemispherical fruit.

Description
It has a weeping habit and rough, fibrous, prickly bark on the lower trunk, rough, scaly bark on the upper trunk and smooth grey to pinkish bark on the branches. The plant has a dense, spreading to pendulous crown.

Flowering occurs from January to April and the flowers are creamy white.

Taxonomy and naming
Eucalyptus todtiana was first formally described by Ferdinand von Mueller in 1882, based on specimens collected by him from sandy ridges near the Greenough and Arrowsmith Rivers in 1877, and also specimens collected by John Forrest from near the Moore River. The description was published in the journal Southern Science Record. The specific name honours Emil Todt, a botanical artist who drew some of the plates for Mueller's Atlas of Eucalypts.

This species is part of the Eucalyptus subgenus series Diversiformae, subseries Neuropterae, a group of mallees that all have adult leaves held erect, buds with a single unscarred operculum and pyramidal seeds.

Distribution and habitat
Coastal blackbutt grows in scrub and in open woodland on sandy flats and gentle slopes on the coastal plain between Perth and Dongara in the Avon Wheatbelt, Geraldton Sandplains, Jarrah Forest and Swan Coastal Plain biogeographic regions.

Ecology
The slow growing, long lived species is a habitat tree for many local fauna such as nectar-feeding birds, bats, lizards and insects.

Conservation status
This eucalypt is classified as "not threatened" by the Western Australian Government Department of Parks and Wildlife.

Use in horticulture
Eucalyptus todtiana is not often grown in cultivation. It grows rapidly as a sapling if planted in an open position, but as an adult it grows slowly and flowers profusely. It is both frost and drought tolerant.

Uses
Indigenous Australians used parts of the tree for medicinal purposes. The leaves as a nasal decongestant or as an antibacterial poultice by crushing the leaves. Leaves were also eaten to relieve dysentery. The gum was also used on sores as an ointment. Leaves from the tree were also commonly used for bedding.

Gallery

See also 

List of Eucalyptus species

References

External links

todtiana
Eucalypts of Western Australia
Myrtales of Australia
Trees of Australia
Trees of Mediterranean climate
Taxa named by Ferdinand von Mueller
Plants described in 1882